Train reporting numbers are used on Australian railway networks to help network operators, and other users, coordinate train movements and identify trains. The numbers are used similarly to airline flight numbers, and enable a train to be identified to network controllers and other relevant authorities, and are also used by train operators for internal train management purposes.

Although Australian train reporting number systems are based on the United Kingdom system, each state has developed its own numbering system, with some similarities and differences. They generally include an indication of an origin and/or destination of a train, but differ in the way they denote the various features of the train, such as the operator, the type of train, the type of load, and whether the train is travelling in an up or down direction.

To date, there has been no significant move towards standardisation of the numbering system.

National (ARTC)
The national interstate network is managed by the Australian Rail Track Corporation (ARTC), which uses a system-wide train reporting number (comprising letters and numbers) to identify trains operating on its network. The train operating number is different depending on the designated part of the network on which the train is operating. These include the Interstate Network, the Heavy Haul (Hunter Valley Coal) Network, and the ARTC-managed lines within state boundaries (Intrastate Networks). Passenger trains are sometimes numbered differently. Other systems are used for specific circumstances, such as light engines, maintenance trains, or heritage trains.

Interstate network numbering
The interstate network connects all main capital cities and uses a four-character numbering system, which applies to both freight and passenger trains.

Heavy haul network numbering
The Heavy Haul network covers both the Hunter Valley Coal network and other coal traffic in NSW.

Hunter Valley Coal Network
The Hunter Valley Coal network is one of the largest haulage networks in Australia. It uses a five-character numbering system but with three groupings of numbers to describe the train.

South and West Coal Network
The South and West Coal network serves those mines not part of the Hunter Valley network, including those in the Central West and the Illawarra. It uses a slightly different five-character numbering system.

Intrastate network numbering
The ARTC operates a number of branch lines within state boundaries. These are often standard gauge lines that would otherwise be isolated, or important lines that connect different parts of the ARTC network but are not part of the Interstate or Heavy Haul networks. Depending on the line, different numbering systems are used depending on the state in which the line is located. These systems are often based on the one used by the state's own rail operator. For example, the line numbering system used in NSW is similar to the ARTC system used on NSW networks. (Refer to the state numbering systems below.)

Other numbering
Other systems are used for passenger trains, light engines, maintenance trains or heritage trains. They are detailed in the relevant Train Operating Manual, but are consistent with those used in the numbering systems of the state's own rail operator.

New South Wales
There are two other rail network administrators in New South Wales: the John Holland Group for the Country Rail Network, and Sydney Trains for the metropolitan network bounded by Berowra, Emu Plains, Macarthur and Waterfall.
Source for all information in this section:

NSW Country Rail Network
The NSW Country Rail Network numbering system is a continuation of the system developed over time by the NSW Government Railways and its successors. It is currently managed by John Holland, though numbering remains the property of Transport for New South Wales.

Train numbers on the NSW Country Rail Network use a four-number system for freight trains.

As with the national system, there are specific numbers for passenger trains, heritage trains and maintenance/inspection trains. Interstate trains and coal network trains are numbered as per the National Interstate network numbering above.

Metropolitan Network
Within the Sydney Trains Network, normal, in-service (passenger) services are assigned numbers consisting of four alpha-numeric characters. The number is made up of a 'run' identifier and followed by a 'trip' identifier. A train will generally keep the same 'run' identifier for the whole day and increment its 'trip' identifier. The 'run' identifier is a 1-3 digit number, with dashes (-) added to make it 3 characters long. The numbers are generally allocated in blocks by scheduled train class. For example, as of October 2019, 1-22 are allocated to B sets. An exception is the Olympic Park line, which has alpha-numeric 'run' identifiers, with the first letter representing its destination (S=Sydney Central, B=Blacktown, L=Lidcombe). The 'trip' identifier is one character, or two for shorter lines, such as the Carlingford or Olympic Park lines. The whole train reporting number is officially referred to as the 'run number'.

The interurban (New South Wales TrainLink) network is slightly less organised, with no link between each successive run performed by a train. Train numbers are four characters, beginning with a one/two letter prefix, followed by numbers. The letter identifies which region the train is operating in:

Victoria
Weekly Notice 4/77 (25 January 1977) advised that the "Train Describer Numbering System" was to be introduced. Originally introduced for trains in the Melbourne suburban area, it was being used state-wide by 1981. It is a four-digit system, and all trains in Victoria are allocated a train number for use in the radio communications system.

The following is a summary of how the system works.

Notes
1. Maroona to Portland is Up
2. Through trains sometimes retain their number, e.g.:
9080 - Geelong to Swan Hill via Tottenham
9280 - Swan Hill to Geelong via Tottenham
In this case the 2nd digit is the destination line, so for the journey before Tottenham the train has a different 2nd digit for the corridor it is running on.
3. In addition to the second digit for electric trains indicating whether it runs via the underground loop, it can also be used to work out which line the train runs on (in addition to the first digit telling you what group of lines the train is on).

4. The following special train numbers are used in certain circumstances
0000 - 0000	Movements not described
0001 - 0100	Light Locomotives
0101 - 0150	Light Locomotives to/from West Tower via Engine Flyover
0151 - 0199	Light Locomotives to/from West Tower -undescribed
0200 - 0239	Special Country Trains in suburban area (used on day-to-day basis)
0240 - 0499	Pilots in the Spencer Street Area
0500 - 0599	Light locos (in connection with metropolitan freight train movements)
0601 - 0699	Docks and shunts at out stations
0700 - 0799	City Circle (anti clockwise)
0800 - 0899	City Circle (clockwise)
0900 - 0999	Standby Trains

ARTC Victorian Standard Gauge Intrastate Trains 
The ARTC has a specific numbering system for trains operating on the ARTC Standard Gauge network within Victoria that do not run into South Australia or New South Wales.

South Australia/Northern Territory
The Adelaide–Darwin railway and branch lines in South Australia are administered by One Rail Australia. For the Adelaide–Darwin Railway, the numbering system used resembles the ARTC one, but there are differences in some of the lettering conventions.

Branch lines are numbered in a manner consistent with the Victorian and NSW Intrastate train numbering systems.

Western Australia

Transperth Services
The Transperth Suburban rail system follows a standard convention, with a 4 digit number followed by two letters, to denote each service. The first number is the line, the following three being sequentially numbered, and the two letters indicating stopping pattern. For example, 3092AS is an all stations up service on the Joondalup Line, and 6065TA is an all stations down service on the Armadale/Thornlie Line to Thornlie.

First Digit
 Mandurah Line
 unallocated
 Joondalup Line
 unallocated
 Armadale Line
 Thornlie Line
 Fremantle Line
 Airport Line
 Midland Line

Pattern Identifiers
 Common identifiers
 xxxxAS - All Stations
Armadale/Thornlie Line
 xxxxB - Express from Claisebrook to Queens Park, stopping only at Oats Street 
 xxxxC - Express from Claisebrook to Cannington, stopping only at Oats Street (also stops at Perth Stadium on Weekends, Public Holidays & for special events)
 xxxxTA - All Stations to Thornlie (excluding Beckenham)
Fremantle Line
 xxxxD - Commences/Terminates at Shenton Park Station
Joondalup Line
 xxxxK - Commences/Terminates at Clarkson Station
 xxxxW - Commences/Terminates at Whitfords Station
 xxxxPW - Commences at Whitfords Station and Terminates at Perth Station
Mandurah Line
 xxxxK - Commences/Terminates at Rockingham Station
 xxxxW - Commences/Terminates at Cockburn Central Station

Queensland

Tasmania

See also
Train reporting number (UK)

References

Rail transport in Australia
Railway management in Australia